The short-footed ctenotus (Ctenotus brevipes)  is a species of skink found in Queensland in Australia.

References

brevipes
Reptiles described in 1981
Taxa named by Glen Milton Storr